Amata humeralis is a species of moth of the family Erebidae first described by Arthur Gardiner Butler in 1876. It is found in Australia, where it has been recorded from Western Australia, the Northern Territory, Queensland and New South Wales.

References 

humeralis
Moths described in 1876
Moths of Australia